Ingrun Helgard Möckel (1941 – October 1977), later Ingrun Neckermann, was a German model. She was crowned Miss Germany in 1960, and Miss Europe in 1961.

Early life 
Möckel was from Düsseldorf. At age 9, she immigrated to New Zealand with her mother. She attended Epsom Girls' Grammar School in Auckland. She was a music student in Baden-Baden when she found fame in beauty pageants.

Career 
Möckel was crowned Miss Rheinland and Miss Germany in 1960, and Miss Europe in 1961, in Beirut. She was a runner-up at the Miss Universe pageant held in Miami, Florida, in 1960, and at the Miss World pageant that same year, held in London. She worked as a fashion model with the Ford agency in New York.

Personal life 
While in New York, Möckel met businessman Johannes Neckermann, son of Josef Neckermann; they married in 1966. They had three children. She died in a car accident in 1977, aged 35 years. Her grave is in the Frankfurt Main Cemetery. In 2001, her three children appeared with singer Billy Joel in a documentary, DIe Akte Joel by filmmaker Beate Thalberg.

References

External links 

 A news photograph from the Neckermanns' 1966 wedding, at Getty Images

1941 births
1977 deaths
German models
German beauty pageant winners
Miss Universe 1960 contestants
Miss Europe winners
People educated at Epsom Girls' Grammar School
Road incident deaths in Germany